This is a list of all mobile phone carriers in the Asia Pacific Region and their respective number of subscribers.

Afghanistan
The country's telecom regulator is the Afghanistan Telecommunications Regulatory Authority (ATRA).

American Samoa
, American Samoa has 32,000 subscribers in total, or an 85% penetration rate.

Australia
, the number of mobile phone subscriptions in Australia was recorded to be 29.28 million which corresponds to a penetration rate of 129.482% over an estimated population of around 21.8 million.

The country's telecom regulator is the Australian Communications and Media Authority.

Bangladesh
The total number of Mobile Phone subscriptions in Bangladesh has reached 180.20 million at the end of December 2022. The country's telecom regulator is the Bangladesh Telecommunication Regulatory Commission (BTRC).

Bhutan

Bougainville

Brunei Darussalam
, the penetration rate in Brunei Darussalam was 114%, over a population estimate of over 400,000.

The country's telecom regulator is the Authority for Info-communications Technology Industry (AITI).

Cambodia
, the penetration rate in Cambodia was estimated at 69.318% over a population estimate of over 14.7 million.

China (mainland)

The country's telecom regulator is the Ministry of Industry and Information Technology.

Cook Islands
, Cook Islands has 6,000 subscribers in total.

Fiji
, the penetration rate in Fiji was estimated at 79.957% over a population estimate of around 0.9 million.

French Polynesia
, the penetration rate in French Polynesia was estimated at 98.7% over a population estimate of around 268.000.

Guam
, Guam has 185,000 subscribers in total.

Hong Kong

, the penetration rate in Hong Kong was estimated at 275% over a population estimate of over 7.521 million, with 23.21 million public mobile subscriptions. Hong Kong's telecom regulator is the Office of the Communications Authority (OFCA).

, there were 24 registered Mobile Virtual Network Operators, apart from the 4 major mobile network operators in Hong Kong.

India

Indonesia

Indonesia has 254.792 million subscribers in total (April 2018), or a 142.00% penetration rate (January 2017).

Japan

, Japan has 182.15 million subscribers in total, or a 144.61% penetration rate.

Kazakhstan
, the penetration rate in Kazakhstan was estimated at 131.09% over a population estimate of around 19.08 million, with 25.012 million mobile subscriptions.

Kyrgyzstan
, Kyrgyzstan has 6.6 million subscribers in total, a 120% penetration rate.

Laos
, Laos mobile penetration was 70.86% with 4.841 millions subscriptions.

Macau

, Macau had about 1.969 million subscribers in total. Macau's telecom regulator is Direcção dos Serviços de Correios e Telecomunicações (DSRT).

Malaysia

, the penetration rate in Malaysia was estimated at 144.2%.

The country's telecom regulator is the Malaysian Communications and Multimedia Commission.

Maldives
, the penetration rate in Maldives was estimated at 116.456% over a population estimate of around 0.4 million.

Marshall Islands
, Marshall Islands has 1000 subscribers in total.

Micronesia, Federated States of
, Federated States of Micronesia has 34,000 subscribers in total.

Mongolia
, the penetration rate in Mongolia was estimated at 80.120% over a population estimate of around 3.1 million.

Myanmar
, the penetration rate in Myanmar was estimated at 105% over a population estimate of around 54 million.

Nauru
, the penetration rate in Nauru was estimated at 42.909% over a population estimate of around 9,000 people. The World Factbook shows 6,700 subscribers in 2011.

Nepal
, the penetration rate in Nepal was estimated at 130.24% over a population estimate of around 26.5 million.

New Caledonia

New Zealand

, the penetration rate in New Zealand was estimated at 124.326% over a population estimate of around 4.3 million.

Niue
As of 2008, Niue has about 385 subscribers in total, a 25% penetration rate.

Norfolk Island
, Norfolk Island has 131 subscribers in total, a 6.5% penetration rate.

North Korea
 North Korea has over a million subscribers in total.

Northern Mariana Islands
, the Northern Mariana Islands have 20,500 subscribers in total.

Pakistan
As of January 2023, Pakistan has 192.78 million subscribers in total with a mobile density of 86.19%.

The country's telecom regulator is the PTA (Pakistan Telecommunication Authority).

Palau
, Palau has 17,150 subscribers in total.

Papua New Guinea
, the penetration rate in Papua New Guinea was estimated at 47.595% over a population estimate of around 6.2 million.

Philippines
, the number of subscribers in the Philippines was estimated at approximately 167.9 million, a 148.39% penetration rate.

The country's telecom regulator is the National Telecommunications Commission (NTC).

Samoa
, Samoa had 146,300 subscribers in total, a 73.4% penetration rate.

Singapore
, the penetration rate in Singapore was estimated at 149.5% over a population estimate of around 5.7 million.

Solomon Islands
, Solomon Islands has 30,000 subscribers in total.

South Korea
, South Korea has 63.7 million subscribers in total or a 122.9% penetration rate.

Sri Lanka
Sri Lanka has 31.4 million subscribers in total, or a 135% penetration rate. (March 2022)

The country's telecom regulator is Telecommunications Regulatory Commission of Sri Lanka (TRCSL).

Note:

 Hutch has acquired Etisalat on 30 November 2018.
 Airtel Lanka Discontinued its 3G Service.
 Dialog Axiata Shut Down its 3G Network  in 2023

Taiwan
, the penetration rate in Taiwan was estimated at 105.354% over a population estimate of around 23 million.

Tajikistan
Tajikistan has an estimated 4.5 million subscribers in total, a 42% penetration rate.

The Telecom Regulator is the Communications Regulatory Agency (CRA).

Thailand
, the mobile penetration rate in Thailand was 135% over a population of around 69.71 million. The regulatory authority for telecommunication in Thailand is the National Broadcasting and Telecommunications Commission (NBTC).

Timor-Leste
Mobile subscribers reach 1.54m at End-2017

Tonga
, Tonga has 0.03 million subscribers in total.

Turkmenistan
, Turkmenistan has 4.44 million subscribers in total or 88.8% penetration rate.

Tuvalu
, Tuvalu has 2,000 subscribers in total.

Uzbekistan
, the penetration rate in Uzbekistan was estimated at 81.205% over a population estimate of around 28.1 million.

The country's telecom regulator is the Uzbekistan Communications and Information Agency's Board (CIAUz).

Vanuatu
, Vanuatu has 327,000 subscribers in total.

Vietnam
, the penetration rate in Vietnam was estimated at 120% over a population estimate of around 91 million.

See also
 Mobile Network Codes in ITU region 4xx (Asia)
 Mobile Network Codes in ITU region 5xx (Oceania)
 List of LTE networks
 List of mobile network operators worldwide
 List of mobile network operators of the Americas
 List of mobile network operators of The Caribbean
 List of mobile network operators of Europe
 List of mobile network operators of the Middle East and Africa

Footnotes

References

Asia-Pacific
Oceania-related lists
Asia Pacific
Telecommunications in Asia
Telecommunications in Oceania
Telecommunications lists